The 2017 U Sports Men's University Cup Hockey Tournament (55th Annual) was held March 16–19, 2017 in Fredericton, New Brunswick and played at the Aitken Centre on UNB's Fredericton campus. This event marked the first year of a successful two-year bid to host the 2017 and 2018 USports University Cup. This is the 3rd time UNB has hosted the University Cup - they first hosted a two-year bid in 2003 & 2004 and again in 2011 & 2012. UNB is the first program to host the event 3 times since the expanded format was introduced in 1998.

The UNB Varsity Reds won their 7th title (6th under head coach Gardiner MacDougall) and their first title defense over the Saskatchewan Huskies coached by Dave Adolph. The #5 seed has appeared in the finals six times since the expanded format started in 1998 and has won three titles; UNB in each case (2007, 2016 & 2017). The #6 seed has appeared in 4 finals and has not yet won.

UNB's title defense follows on the heels of Alberta's back-to-back titles in 2014 & 2015.

UNB and Alberta are the only two teams to host and win since the expanded format was introduced in 1998 - they each have two titles at home (Alberta - 2005 and 2006 / UNB - 2011 and 2017)

This is the 3rd straight appearance for UNB in the finals (2015-Silver, 2016-Gold & 2017 Gold). This has only occurred three other times going back to 1983 (34 years);
- UNB (2007-Gold, 2008-Silver, 2009-Gold)
- UQTR (2001-Gold, 2002-Silver, 2003-Gold)
- Saskatchewan (1981-Silver, 1982-Silver, 1983-Gold)

Road to the Cup

AUS playoffs

OUA playoffs

Note: UQTR Patriotes forfeit all games from January 25, 2017 to February 25, 2017, as well as their first 13 games of the next season, due to an ineligible player. There original 2016-17 record of 16-10-2 (34pts for 5th) was corrected to 13-13-2 (28pts for 7th). However, this change is not reflected here because the foul and subsequent forfeitures were not announced until January 18th, 2018 (the following season) when the infraction became known.

Canada West playoffs

University Cup tournament
The eight teams to advance to the tournament are listed below. The three(3) conference champions must be seeded 1-3 followed by the OUA Runner-up (seed #4). The remaining four seeds are for the AUS Finalist, Canada West Finalist, OUA Third-place and host. Their seedings are based on the pre-tournament rankings. Since UNB advanced as the AUS Runner-up, Acadia would represent the host.

Weather
A Nor'easter traveled across Ontario, Quebec, New England and the Maritimes on Tuesday, two days before the tournament started. The storm cancelled flights east out of Toronto, Ottawa and Montreal. This impacted Queen's who had scheduled to leave on Tuesday by bus to Toronto where they would fly to Fredericton. They were informed their flight was cancelled and they instead booked a bus to Fredericton leaving Tuesday afternoon. They got as far as Quebec City where they stayed the night. McGill had also started their journey by bus on Tuesday and got as far as Riviere-du-Loup.

Poor road conditions and road closures stranded both teams for the entire day on Wednesday in their respective locations. As such they were not able to attend the UCup Gala on Wednesday night. They continued their journeys on Thursday and both arrive mid-day on Thursday. This had the biggest impact on Queen's who was scheduled to play UNB that night at 7pm local (AST). The game was delayed by 1 hour to 8pm to provide Queen's some additional time to prepare. The travel impact was less for McGill whose first game wasn't until Friday.

Saskatchewan Huskies arrived on Monday but not all of their equipment did - they had to purchase a sizable amount of equipment from a local sporting goods store to outfit the team for their first practice on Tuesday. The missing bags did arrive late Wednesday.

Tournament format
The tournament is a traditional 8 team, single elimination ladder with Bronze medal game between the two semi-final losers. Games that are tied after regulation play a 10-minute overtime period following the 3rd period. If there is no score after the first overtime, the ice is cleaned and they would play 20 minute periods (with ice cleaned between periods) until there is a winner.

The higher seed is the 'Home' team for each game (the home team must wear their 'white' jerseys and will get the last change during stoppages of play).

The UNB Varsity Reds played as the visitor in games 1 but as the home team in games 2 & 3. The Saskatchewan Huskies were the visitor in all three of their games.

Bronze game

Championship final

Tournament All-Stars
Philippe Maillet, from the UNB Varsity Reds, was selected as the Major W.J. 'Danny' McLeod Award for U Sports University Cup MVP. Maillet had 4 goals and 6 assist for 10 points in 3 games. 3 of his goals were scored in their quarter-final game vs Queen's (a hat trick) and 4 of his assists were scored in the gold medal game.

Joining Maillet on the tournament all-star team were:
Forward Cam Braes (UNB Varsity Reds)
Forward Levi Cable (Saskatchewan Huskies)
Defenceman Geoff Schemitsch (Acadia Axemen)
Defenceman Jesse Forsberg (Saskatchewan Huskies)
Goalie Étienne Marcoux (UNB Varsity Reds)

References

External links
 Tournament Website

U Sports ice hockey
Ice hockey competitions in New Brunswick
University Cup, 2017
Sport in Fredericton
2017 in New Brunswick